Ben James Greenhalgh (born 16 April 1992) is an English footballer and golfer who plays as a midfielder or striker for Margate where he is also assistant manager. He is noted for winning the football reality show Football's Next Star, where he won a contract at Italian giants Inter Milan.

Career

Football's Next Star
Greenhalgh, from Orpington, who played for the Welling United youth team, was featured in the Sky One show Football's Next Star and impressed judges in the trial game after laying on a perfect cross for Hicham Abdellah to head home. At the end of the opening episode, the judges presented the Inter Milan shirt to ten players who would travel to Italy to compete for their dream of a professional contract in later episodes.

After 20,000 entries to the show and eight episodes, Greenhalgh was given the shirt and revealed as the winner of Football's Next Star 2010, receiving a professional six-month contract with Inter Milan.

Back in the United Kingdom
After his six-month professional contract at Inter Milan came to an end, Greenhalgh was offered another year from the Italian giants which included a four-month loan spell to Calcio Como, where he scored eight goals from 12 games. Despite never playing a senior game during his time with Inter Milan, Greenhalgh was presented with a Champions League Winners medal after being part of the travelling squad for the 2010 UEFA Champions League Final. After his contract was up, he returned to the UK and spent time at Brighton & Hove Albion, as well as a spell at Birmingham City, where he was advised to play first team football in the Conference to gain experience in the English game. He signed for non-League club Welling United in December, before later joining Ebbsfleet United and Maidstone United.

In June 2013 he transferred to Scottish club Inverness Caledonian Thistle. This was due to happen in February 2013, however international clearance stopped Greenhalgh from leaving England until the 2013–14 season.

Having played only six first-team games for Inverness, Greenhalgh was loaned to Scottish League One club Stenhousemuir for the final six games of the season.

In June 2014 it was reported that Inverness had opted not to offer Greenhalgh a further contract, with manager John Hughes stating that he could not guarantee Greenhalgh first-team football. He currently coaches at football training camps, run by Skills Academy Director Mike Delaney

It was announced on 22 June 2015, that Greenhalgh had signed for National League South side Concord Rangers, returning to a club where he had made a big impact during the run-in of the 2012–13 season, winning both the Isthmian League Cup, and the Isthmian League Premier Division play-offs.

On 26 May 2016, it was announced that Greenhalgh had signed for Maidstone United again. He was released by Maidstone a year later in May 2017. He was immediately signed by National League South side Hemel Hempstead Town, who had Greenhalgh on loan towards the back end of the 2016–17 season.

On 24 May 2018, it was announced that Greenhalgh had signed for Dartford.

On 8 November 2019, it was announced that Greenhalgh had signed for Tonbridge Angels on an initial month's loan. His loan was then extended until 4 January 2020.
On 7 January 2020, it was announced that Greenhalgh had left Dartford by mutual consent. The following day, Greenhalgh signed permanently for Tonbridge Angels.

On 6 April 2021, Greenhalgh signed for Margate for the 2021-22 season. Greenhalgh was appointed captain ahead of the 2022–23 season. In December 2022, the sacking of Andy Drury saw Greenhalgh appointed joint-caretaker manager with fellow player Reece Prestedge. On 31 January 2023, Prestedge was appointed manager on a permanent basis with Greenhalgh as his assistant manager.

Personal life
As of October 2020, Greenhalgh is currently academy manager at Dartford. In 2015 he became a professional golfer and joined the PGA circuit, playing in one-day golf tournaments while continuing to play semi-professional football.

In 2022 Ben was appointed coach for the year 6 football team at Crofton Junior School which he has taken them to the final of Bromley schools cup 2022

Career statistics

Managerial statistics

Honours
Welling United
 Kent Senior Cup: 2008-09

Brighton & Hove Albion 
 Sussex Senior Cup: 2011-12

Concord Rangers 
 Isthmian League Cup: 2012-13

Concord Rangers 
 Isthmian League Play-off Final: 2012-13

Maidstone United 
 Isthmian League: 2014-15

Concord Rangers 
 Essex Senior Cup: 2015-16

Concord Rangers 
 National League South Team-of-the-Season: 2015-16

References

External links
 
 

1992 births
Living people
Footballers from Orpington
English footballers
Association football midfielders
Welling United F.C. players
Inter Milan players
Como 1907 players
Ebbsfleet United F.C. players
Maidstone United F.C. players
Inverness Caledonian Thistle F.C. players
Stenhousemuir F.C. players
National League (English football) players
Isthmian League players
Scottish Professional Football League players
English expatriate footballers
English expatriate sportspeople in Italy
Expatriate footballers in Italy
Concord Rangers F.C. players
Dartford F.C. players
Tonbridge Angels F.C. players
Margate F.C. players
Margate F.C. managers
Isthmian League managers